Maximiliano Callorda Lafont (born 4 April 1990 in Uruguay) is a Uruguayan footballer.

Career

While playing for Defensor Sporting, Callorda broke his cruciate ligaments, which affected his ability. 

In 2014, Callorda signed for C.S.D. Municipal in Guatemala, where he claimed that the infrastructure was better than in Uruguay.

In 2018, he signed for Honduran side Real C.D. España. However, Callorda was under immense pressure due to being a foreign player and was criticized despite scoring two goals in his first two games. He was also accused of being overweight.

References

External links
 Maximiliano Callorda at Soccerway

Uruguayan footballers
Living people
Association football forwards
1990 births
El Tanque Sisley players
Defensor Sporting players
C.S.D. Municipal players
S.D. Aucas footballers
Universidad Técnica de Cajamarca footballers
Boston River players
Real C.D. España players
C.A. Rentistas players
Ayacucho FC footballers
People from Flores Department
Uruguayan expatriate footballers
Expatriate footballers in Guatemala
Uruguayan expatriate sportspeople in Guatemala
Expatriate footballers in Honduras
Uruguayan expatriate sportspeople in Honduras